Jean Rossius (27 December 1890, Cerexhe-Heuseux, Soumagne – 2 May 1966) was a Belgian road racing cyclist who won five stages in total in the Tour de France. In the 1914 Tour de France he finished in fourth place in the overall classification, his best finishing.

Major results

1914
Tour de France:
Winner stages 2 and 9
Leading general classification for 4 days (joint with Philippe Thys)
1919
Liège-Malmedy-Liège
  Belgian National Road Race Championships
Tour de France:
Winner stage 1
1920
Retinne-Spa-Retinne
Tour de France:
Winner stages 7 and 15
1922
Paris-Saint-Étienne

References

External links

Official Tour de France results for Jean Rossius

1890 births
1966 deaths
People from Soumagne
Belgian male cyclists
Belgian Tour de France stage winners
Cyclists from Liège Province